Hypoptopoma elongatum is a species of catfish of the family Loricariidae.

This catfish reaches a maximum length of  SL. It is demersal, being found in fresh water in the tropics.
 
Hypoptopoma elongatum is native to South America, occurring in Lower Rio Tapajos and lower Rio Trombetas.

Interactions with humans
Hypoptopoma elongatum is harmless to humans.

References

Aquino, A.E. and S.A. Schaefer, 2010. Systematics of the genus Hypoptopoma Günther, 1868 (Siluriformes, Loricariidae). Bull. Amer. Mus. Nat. Hist. 336:1-110. 

Hypoptopomatini
Catfish of South America
Taxa named by Adriana Elbia Aquino
Taxa named by Scott Allen Schaefer
Fish described in 2010